The University of Sarajevo Faculty of Law, also known as the Sarajevo Law School, is one of the leading schools of the University of Sarajevo, Bosnia and Herzegovina. The school is located in Sarajevo's downtown district next to the Latin Bridge and not far from Baščaršija, the city's historical and cultural center.

History
The Sarajevo Law School was founded through a legal act on 20 August 1946 and it became the first member of the University of Sarajevo. Mehmed Begović, Distinguished Research Professor at the University of Belgrade's Faculty of Law specializing in Yugoslav Sharia law was the driving power for establishing the school's program and organization (along with Gorazd Kušej from Ljubljana and Pavao Rastovčan from Zagreb). Russian lawyer and historian Alexander Soloviev served as the first Dean of the Sarajevo Law School from 1947 to 1949.

Organization
The law school is divided into five chairs:
 Chair of State and International Public Law;
 Chair of Legal-Economic Sciences;
 Chair of Civil Law;
 Chair of Legal History and Comparative Law;
 Chair of Criminal Law.

Degree programs
The Bachelor's program lasts four years carrying 240 ECTS credits.
Degree of Graduate lawyer was also offered for those who enrolled before the Bologna reform.

References

External links
Sarajevo Law School website (in Bosnian, English)

University of Sarajevo
Law schools in Bosnia and Herzegovina
Sarajevo
Educational institutions established in 1946
1946 establishments in Yugoslavia